Anshel Pfeffer (Hebrew: אנשיל פפר, born 22 June 1973) is a British-born Israeli journalist. He is a senior correspondent and columnist for Haaretz, covering military, Jewish and international affairs, and Israel correspondent for The Economist.

Personal life
Pfeffer was born to a Jewish family in Manchester in the United Kingdom. He was one of six children born to David and Miriam Pfeffer. His family immigrated to Israel in 1981. He served in the Israel Defense Forces in the Golani Brigade.

Career
Pfeffer has been a working journalist since 1997. He has written for a variety of publications including The Guardian, The New York Times, The Washington Post and The Times.

His Haaretz column, "Jerusalem & Babylon", was a series of articles which covered issues relating to Israel and to Jewish identity, for which he received the B'nai B'rith award for "Recognizing Excellence in Diaspora Reportage"

Pfeffer's British passport has enabled Haaretz to send him to cover stories such as the 2011 Egyptian Revolution in countries that are reluctant to permit entry to Israelis.

Bibliography
 Bibi:  The Turbulent Life and Times of Benjamin Netanyahu, Basic Books, 2018.

Further reading
 Jonathan Freedland, "Trump's Chaver in Jerusalem" (review of Anshel Pfeffer, Bibi:  The Turbulent Life and Times of Benjamin Netanyahu, Basic Books, 2018), New York Review of Books, vol. LXV, no 13 (16 August 2018), pp. 32–34.  "As Pfeffer concludes, 'His [Netanyahu's] ultimate legacy will not be a more secure nation, but a deeply fractured Israeli society, living behind walls.'"
 Adam Shatz, "The sea is the same sea" (review of Anshel Pfeffer, Bibi:  The Turbulent Life and Times of Benjamin Netanyahu, Hurst, May 2018), London Review of Books, vol. 40, no. 16 (30 August 2018), pp. 24, 26–28.  Adam Shatz concludes:  "Under Netanyahu, Israel has run up a substantial bill in blood and tears.  Unlike his wife's credit card, it will eventually have to be paid."

References

1973 births
Living people
British male journalists
British columnists
British emigrants to Israel
British Jews
Israeli journalists
Israeli columnists
Israeli Jews
Haaretz
Writers from Manchester